Kinsale GAA is a Gaelic Athletic Association club based in the town of Kinsale, Cork, Republic of Ireland. The club, which was founded in 1886, fields teams in both Gaelic football and hurling. It is a member of the Carrigdhoun division of Cork GAA.

Achievements
 Cork Senior Football Championship (0): Runners-Up 1900, 1894 (as Kinsale Black & Whites)
 Cork Intermediate Football Championship (1): 2011
 Cork Intermediate Hurling Championship (1): 1926
 Cork Junior Football Championship (2): 1900, 1932
 Cork Junior Hurling Championship (1): 1918
 Carrigdhoun Junior A Football Championship (18): 1930, 1932, 1945, 1946, 1948, 1949, 1953, 1958, 1960, 1961, 1965, 1973, 1974, 1976, 1978, 1999, 2001, 2005, 2022
 Carrigdhoun Junior A Hurling Championship (6): 1930, 1933, 1978, 1984, 1989, 2007, 2020
 South-East Under 21 "A" Hurling Championship Winners (3) 1970, 1971, 1972
 South-East Under 21 "A" Football Championship Winners (11) 1970, 1971, 1973, 1974, 1977, 1978, 1982, 1983, 1999, 2000, 2010
 South-East Under 21 "B" Hurling Championship Winners (2) 2010, 2019
 South-East Under 21 "B" Football Championship Winners (1) 2013

Notable players
 Jack Barrett
 Jim O'Regan

References

External links
 

Gaelic games clubs in County Cork
Gaelic football clubs in County Cork
Hurling clubs in County Cork
Sport in Kinsale